The 1937 Idaho Southern Branch Bengals football team was an American football team that represented the University of Idaho, Southern Branch (later renamed Idaho State University) as an independent during the 1937 college football season. In their third season under head coach Guy Wicks, the team compiled a 6–3 record and outscored opponents by a total of 213 to 66.

Future Idaho State head football coach Babe Caccia played on the team.

Schedule

Notes

References

External links
 1938 Wickiup football section — yearbook summary of the 1937 season

Idaho Southern Branch
Idaho State Bengals football seasons
Idaho Southern Branch Bengals football